

The Naval Education Service was a branch of the British Royal Navy which both provided education for naval personnel and ran schools for children of Royal Navy personnel.

History
It was originally known as the Department of Naval Education of the Admiralty from 1914 until 1951 when it was renamed the Naval Education Service. It was under the control of the Office of the Second Sea Lord. It was abolished in 1978. Some of its functions have now been taken over by Service Children's Education.

The Director of Education (later Adviser on Naval Education) was a civilian employed within the Admiralty who was responsible for providing advice on non-professional education from 1903 until 1936, when naval officers took over responsibility.

Director of Education
Sir James Alfred Ewing, 1903−1917
, 1917−1919 (acting director)

Adviser on Naval Education
Alexander McMullen, 1919−1936

Directors of the Education Department of the Admiralty
Instructor Captain Arthur Hall, 1936−1945
Instructor Captain William Saxton, 1945−1948
Instructor Captain William Bishop, 1948−1951

Directors of the Naval Education Service and Heads of the Instructor Branch

Instructor Rear-Admiral Sir William Bishop, 1951−1956
Instructor Rear-Admiral Sir John Fleming, 1956−1960
Instructor Rear-Admiral Sir Charles Darlington, 1960−1965
Instructor Rear-Admiral Albert Bellamy, 1965−1970
Instructor Rear-Admiral Brinley Morgan, 1970−1975
Rear-Admiral John Bell, 1975−1978

Chief Naval Instructor Officers
Held in conjunction with another appointment.
Rear-Admiral John Bell, 1978
Rear-Admiral William Waddell, 1978−1981
Rear-Admiral Trevor Spraggs, 1981−1983
Rear-Admiral G. A. Baxter, 1983−1984
Captain J. Marsh, 1984−?
Rear-Admiral Jack Howard, 1987−1989

See also
Royal Air Force Educational Service
Royal Army Educational Corps

References

Naval education and training in the United Kingdom